Bokovo-Platove is an urban-type settlement in Rovenky Raion (district) in Luhansk Oblast of eastern Ukraine. Population:

Demographics
Native language distribution as of the Ukrainian Census of 2001:
 Ukrainian: 13.87%
 Russian: 86.27%
 Others 0.12%

References

Urban-type settlements in Rovenky Raion